KUTH-DT (channel 32) is a television station licensed to Provo, Utah, United States, broadcasting the Spanish-language Univision and UniMás networks to Salt Lake City and the state of Utah. The station is owned and operated by TelevisaUnivision, and maintains studios on West Amelia Earhart Drive in the northwestern section of Salt Lake City; its transmitter is located west of Orem, in the Lake Mountains.

History
The station first signed on the air on April 17, 2003 as KCBU, operating as an independent station; it was originally owned by Cocola Broadcasting. Univision Communications bought the station in October 2004 and entered into an outsourcing agreement with Equity Broadcasting (which Univision's principals held a stake in at the time) to operate the station. At that time, channel 32 swapped affiliations and call signs with what was then KUTH (Utah's original full-power Univision affiliate on channel 12, licensed to Logan, Utah, which became KUTF in 2005) and became the new Univision affiliate.

When Univision sold the last of its shares in Equity Broadcasting in 2007, KUTH was supposed to go to Equity outright; however, the transfer of KUTH from Univision to Equity never materialized. Later, Univision planned to purchase KUTF to create a duopoly with KUTH but cancelled its plans shortly after Newport Television announced the sale of its Salt Lake City duopoly to High Plains Broadcasting; by that time, private-equity firm Providence Equity Partners owned sizable stakes in both Univision and Newport Television. This cancellation resulted in Newport Television retaining ownership of KTVX (channel 4) and selling only KUCW (channel 30) to High Plains Broadcasting (with Newport Television continuing to control both of those stations).

Under Equity's management of the station, all of KUTH's programming originated from Equity's master control hub at the company's headquarters in Little Rock, Arkansas. This arrangement ended on June 12, 2009 as part of the completion of the digital television transition, at which time Univision took over the operations of KUTH outright. KUTH has a construction permit to move its transmitter facilities to Farnsworth Peak in the Oquirrh Mountains west of Salt Lake City. The move would allow better coverage for the station in the Salt Lake City metro area and points along the Wasatch Front where Lake Mountain stations would be weak.

News operation
Under Equity's management of the station, KUTH began airing weeknight newscasts at 5 and 10 p.m. The newscasts were produced out of the company's headquarters in Little Rock, with reports filed by Salt Lake City-based reporters. The newscasts were canceled in June 2008, after Equity instituted a companywide suspension of news programs on its Univision-affiliated stations. Local newscasts would not return to KUTH until September 30, 2013, when Univision launched weeknight 5 and 10 p.m. newscasts branded Noticias 32 Salt Lake City.

Technical information

Subchannels
The station's digital signal is multiplexed:

Translators

Analog-to-digital conversion
Because it was granted an original construction permit after the FCC finalized the DTV allotment plan on April 21, 1997 , the station did not receive a companion channel for a digital television station. Instead, KUTH shut down its analog signal, over UHF channel 32. The station "flash-cut" its digital signal into operation UHF channel 32. On June 23, all Univision-owned full-service stations, including KUTH, added the -DT suffix to their legal call signs.

References

External links 

Univision network affiliates
UniMás network affiliates
GetTV affiliates
Ion Mystery affiliates
True Crime Network affiliates
Twist (TV network) affiliates
UTH-DT
Mass media in Salt Lake City
Television channels and stations established in 2003
2003 establishments in Utah
Spanish-language television stations in Utah